Svengali is a character in the novel Trilby which was first published in 1894 by George du Maurier. Svengali is a man who seduces, dominates and exploits Trilby, a young half-Irish girl, and makes her into a famous singer.

Definition 
After the book’s publication in 1894, the word "svengali" has come to refer to a person who, with evil intent, dominates, manipulates and controls another.

In court, the Svengali Defence is a legal tactic that portrays the defendant as a pawn in the scheme of a greater, and more influential, criminal mastermind.

Novel
Svengali is a typical antisemitic portrayal of an Ashkenazic (eastern European) Jew, complete with "bold, black, beady Jew's eyes" and a "hoarse, rasping, nasal, throaty rook's caw, his big yellow teeth baring themselves in a mongrel canine snarl". He is continually filthy and yet still "clean enough to suit (his own) kind". George Orwell wrote that Svengali, who while cleverer than the Englishmen, is evil, effeminate, and physically repugnant, was "a sinister caricature of the traditional type" and an example of "the prevailing form of antisemitism."

In the novel, Svengali transforms Trilby into a great singer by using hypnosis. Unable to perform without Svengali’s help, Trilby becomes entranced.

Portrayals
Svengali was almost immediately stripped of his Judaism in portrayals. Svengali was first portrayed by the English actor Herbert Beerbohm Tree in London and by the actor Wilton Lackaye in the United States in the stage play of 1895, Trilby. The story has also been used in several movies.

The character was portrayed in the following films which were all titled Svengali: first by Ferdinand Bonn in the silent film of 1914, then by Paul Wegener in the silent film of 1927, by John Barrymore in 1931, by Donald Wolfit in 1954 (in Technicolor), and by Peter O'Toole in the film of 1983, which was a modernised version made for television and co-starred Jodie Foster. In the movie of March 1983 however, the names of the characters were changed.

The character "Levi Svengali" was portrayed by actor and director Ash Avildsen in the television series Paradise City released by Amazon Prime Video in March 2021.

Popular culture
The 2011/12 stage show of Derren Brown, a British illusionist, revolves around an automaton named Svengali. He makes multiple reference to the novel throughout the show.

In Better Call Saul, season 2, episode 8, Chuck McGill refers to his brother Jimmy as a “Svengali.” Jimmy would later take up the Judaic name “Saul,” which connects to the original stereotypical anti-Semitic trope.

References

External links
 ; vol. 2; vol. 3.
 

Characters in British novels of the 19th century
Fantasy film characters
Literary characters introduced in 1894
Fictional hypnotists and indoctrinators
Fictional Jews
Male literary villains
Trilby (novel)
Male characters in literature
Antisemitism in literature